Trisodium pentaborate is a salt that can form as a monohydrate with formula , which contains the anion dihydroxydopentaborate .  

It may also be called simply sodium pentaborate, but this name is more properly reserved for the compound with elemental formula .

Structure

Trisodium pentaborate monohydrate crystallizes as thin plates in the orthorhombic crystal system, with symmetry group Pbca and cell parameters a = 880.4 pm, b = 1837.1 pm, c = 1092.4 pm, formulas per cell Z = 8.

References

sodium compounds
borates